Jarosz is a Polish surname. Notable people with this surname include:

 Elżbieta Jarosz (born 1971), Polish long-distance runner
 Hieronim Jarosz Sieniawski (c. 1516–1579), Polish noble
 Jakub Jarosz (born 1987), Polish volleyball player
 Łukasz Jarosz (born 1979), Polish kickboxer
 Maciej Jarosz (born 1959), Polish volleyball player
 Sarah Jarosz (born 1991), American singer
 Teddy Yarosz, earlier Jarosz (1910–1974), American boxer

See also
 
 Yarosh
 Jaroš (surname)
 Jarosch

Polish-language surnames